This is a list of media in Peterborough, Ontario, Canada.

Radio
In addition to Peterborough's own radio market, some (but not all) radio stations from the Greater Toronto Area can also be heard in the area. Peterborough is in an unusual position in this respect; the city has more radio stations of its own than some larger cities, such as Oshawa or Brampton, which are located in the Toronto market.

Internet Radio

 Radio Free Peterborough is a 12-year old internet radio station from Peterborough.
 Pet Rock Radio Network is an online internet radio station from Peterborough.

Television
Peterborough is home to a local television station, CHEX-DT, a Global O&O owned by Corus Entertainment, and a local cable only station, TV Cogeco, which is owned and operated by Cogeco cable, and provided as a service to local cable subscribers. CHEX is one of the oldest broadcasting television stations in Canada. Founders included writer Robertson Davies and his father William Rupert Davies. The transmitter tower for CHEX Peterborough is on Television Hill on the east side of the city and is used to broadcast both television and radio.

Newspapers
The Peterborough Examiner is the regional daily newspaper, and one of the area's original local publishers. From 1942 to 1955, it was both owned and edited by renowned Canadian author Robertson Davies, who resided in the city. In the late 1980s, the tabloid-style Peterborough This Week entered the market, taking a large share of advertising away from the Examiner. Peterborough This Week is a free newspaper delivered to most homes in Peterborough County. Alternatively, Arthur and The Absynthe are student newspapers funded and produced by Trent University students. They are distributed at no cost on the university campus and in the downtown area.  The first issue of The Wire Megazine was published in 1989. The tabloid continues to publish monthly and is one of the country's oldest independent alternative presses. It is free and available throughout the Kawarthas and enjoys a wide range of advertisers and readers.

Websites
Radio Free Peterborough is a 100% Volunteer-run Internet Radio project founded in 2004 in partnership with Trent Radio 92.7 CFFF FM - playing an all-Peterborough catalogue of nearly 13,000 tracks with over 85,000 hours of FM Broadcast time in Peterborough and surrounding area.

Pet Rock Radio is an online alternative radio station based in Peterborough, with a satellite division in Regina, Saskatchewan.

The Peterborough Squirrel is a local website that features a blog and links to community events.

PTBO.com and Peterborough.org also feature news and information from Peterborough.

PTBOMEDIA @ptbomedia is an Instagram-based news service featuring National, Provincial and Peterborough Municipal News. 

The KnowAboutNetwork is an international online business directory; its Peterborough website provides an opportunity to post local events. Electriccitylive.ca offers information about music events in the Peterborough area.

References

Peterborough

Media, Peterborough